The principle of  holds that language referring to females, such as the suffix -ess (as in actress), the use of man to mean "human", and other such devices, strengthens the perceptions that the male category is the norm and that the corresponding female category is a derivation and thus less important. The idea was first clearly expressed by 19th-century thinkers who began deconstructing the English language to expose the products and footings of patriarchy.

The principle of male as norm and the relation between gendered grammar and the way in which its respective speakers conceptualize their world has received attention in varying fields from philosophy to psychology and anthropology, and has fueled debates over linguistic determinism and gender inequality. 
The underlying message of this principle is that women speak a less legitimate language that both sustains and is defined by the subordination of the female gender as secondary to the accepted male-biased normative language. By regarding women's language as deficient in relation to that of men it has been assumed that women's language is imperfect. Subsequent research in the social sciences, particularly in discourse analysis, has maintained and qualified systematic male bias. In practice, grammatical gender exhibits a systematic structural bias that has made masculine forms the default for generic, non-gender-specific contexts. The male as norm principle claims that the male linguistic bias works to exclude and ignore women, diminish the female experience, and determine that female ideas or forms are unfit to represent many social categories.

Historical development

Shift from sexual hierarchy to sexual binary (1800s) 
In the eighteenth-century there was a radical reinterpretation of the female body in relation to the male. Prior to this change in thinking, men and women were qualified by their degree of metaphysical perfection whereas by the late eighteenth century there was a new model established on ideas of radical dimorphism and biological divergence. Biologists used developments in the study of anatomy and physiology to change the understanding of sexual difference into that of kind rather than degree. This metaphysical shift in the understanding of sex and gender, as well as the interplay of these redefined social categories, solidified many of the existing beliefs in the inherent disparities of men and women. This allowed scientists, policy makers, and others of cultural influence to promulgate a belief in the gender binary under a veil of positivism and scientific enlightenment.

Since the eighteenth century, the dominant view of sexual difference has been that of two stable, incommensurable, and opposite sexes on which the political, economic, and cultural lives of men and women are based and social order is sustained. Contrary to modern day, "the dominant discourse construed the male and female bodies as hierarchically, vertically, ordered versions of one sex" rather than as "horizontally ordered opposites, as incommensurable." In fact, it wasn't until the second half of the eighteenth century that the idea of two distinct sexes was established and, through the politics of the day, generated new ways of understanding people and social reality.
The recognition and discussion of this transition by protofeminists around the 19th century established the foundation upon which feminists would later scrutinize gendered language, challenge the gender binary and its inherent prejudices, and develop the male as norm principle.

Mid-20th century

Simone de Beauvoir 
In 1949, the French existentialist Simone de Beauvoir described in her book The Second Sex two concepts that would later be developed in the fields of linguistics and psychology and become the basis for the male as norm principle in second-wave feminism. Beauvoir writes that man is regarded as "both the positive and the neutral," foreshadowing the study of markedness, or the linguistic distinction between the "marked" and "unmarked" terms of an opposition. Specifically, "the notion that the typical contrast between opposites… is not symmetric." Rather, the contrast between oppositions is often asymmetric meaning "the positive, or unmarked, term can be neutralized in meaning to denote the scale as a whole rather than just the positive end; but the negative, or marked, term can denote just the negative end". Unaffixed masculine or singular forms are taken to be unmarked in contrast to affixed feminine or plural forms.

Beauvoir goes on to write that "there is an absolute human type, the masculine... Thus humanity is male," and the neutralizing of man to include woman is no longer her subject, rather the masculinizing of the whole human species to exclude woman–or at least to otherize her. Thus, introducing her second concept and foreshadowing the psychological concept of prototypicality and the development of the prototype theory in the 1970s. "The prototype theory is a model of graded categorizations, where some members of a category are more central than others. A prototype helps to explain the meaning of a word by resembling to the clearest exemplar". "All members of a category do not have equal status in the mind of the human perceiver; some members are instead perceived as more equal–or more prototypical–than other members… Like the prototypical member of any category, the male is taken to be the cognitive reference point, the standard, for the category of human being; and like the non-prototypical members of any category, the female is taken to be a variation on that prototype, a less representative example of the human species".

Luce Irigaray 
Just as Simone de Beauvoir had done in recent decades, French feminist and literary scholar Luce Irigaray centered her ideas regarding the male as norm principle around the idea that women as a whole are otherized by systematic gender inequality, particularly through gendered language and how female experience and subjectivity are defined by variation from a male norm; through opposition in a phallocentric system where language is deliberately employed as a method of protecting the interests of the phallus and subliminally affirming his position as norm.
Irigaray affirms that the designation of woman as an inferior version of men, an aberrant variation from the male norm, is reflected throughout Western history and philosophy. . In this tradition of inequality women are measured against a male standard, seen in comparison – as lack, complementary or the same. She asserts that any perception of difference between the two genders is an illusion. "Where women are not the same as men, they fail to exist altogether."

Dale Spender 
Dale Spender is one of the most cited feminist scholars to work with the male as norm principle. She claims that "patriarchy is a frame of reference, a particular way of classifying and organizing the objects and events of the world" With language we classify and organize the world and through which we have the ability to manipulate reality. In this way, if our language is systematically flawed and/or rests on an understructure of invalid rules then we are misled and deceived at a fundamental perceptual level.
The rules by which we make meaning, ones intrinsically associated with language, had to be invented and defined. These linguistic rules establish our frame of reference, order, and the grounds from which we interpret and comprehend reality. Spender explains that  these rules become self-validating and self-perpetuating with the passing of time, regardless of the validity of the beliefs and/or interpretations on which they were founded.

Spender claims that  the semantic rule of male as norm may appear to be ineffectual in producing the purported significant social impact concluded by many feminists, however this is in fact part of why the rule is so pervasive and superlatively harmful in the construction of our perceptions of gender. As long as this rule remains central to gendered languages users of these languages will continue to classify the world on the premise that males are the standard, normal being and that those who are not male will be considered deviant. Speakers will continue to divide humanity into two unfairly biased parts. "By arranging the objects and events of the world according to these rules we set up the rationale, and the vindication, for male supremacy."

Gerda Lerner 
Over the course of feminist historian Gerda Lerner's career, Lerner focuses her studies on patriarchal power and the history of the subordination of women. By examining gender stratification in various societies throughout human history in accordance with language, Lerner provides an in-depth look into the historical and modern significance of the male as norm principle. She was one of the founders of the field of women's history and played a key role in the development of women's history curricula. In Lerner's book The Creation of Patriarchy (1986), she addresses how men have in history appropriated the major symbols of female power, constructed religions around "the counterfactual metaphor of male procreativity," and have "redefined female existence in a narrow and sexually dependent way." She explains that the metaphors for gender, created and promoted by men, have "expressed the male as norm and the female as deviant; the male as whole and powerful, the female as unfinished, mutilated, and lacking in autonomy." According to Lerner, men have constructed, explained, and defined the world in their own terms and have placed themselves at the center of discourse.

Lerner goes on to explain how men, by establishing male-centered language and discourse as the norm, have in turn demanded an androcentric perspective and necessitated the conceptualization of women as less than men and have distorted the definition of woman to the degree that their experiences, autonomy, and viewpoints have been lost to modern consideration. In turn, men have come to believe that their experiences, viewpoint, and ideas represent all of human experience and thought. She concludes that as long as men are unable to recognize the female perspective and as long as they believe they have the only legitimate human experience they will be unable to accurately define and understand reality.

Modern perspectives

Sue Wilkinson 
In 1997 Sue Wilkinson, a professor of Feminist and Health Studies from Loughborough University, wrote that there are distinct theoretical traditions in feminism that assert women's inferiority, two of which are rooted in the idea of male as norm. First, psychology has mismeasured women throughout its history by taking a male as norm perspective which categorizes females as deviant; or, in other words of Simone De Beauvoir, the science of psychology has systematically "otherized" women. Another way which Wilkinson sees women's inferiority asserted is through psychologists seeking a different perspective, the female perspective, by listening to women's voices and drawing on, and feeding back into, preconceived ideas regarding female moral and cognitive processes as they differ from those of males. Wilkinson writes that we should reconstruct the question of sex differences and that we need to dismantle maleness and femaleness as fundamental categories.

Jeannine Hill Fletcher 
In her book Motherhood as Metaphor: Engendering Interreligious Dialogue, the theologian Jeannine Hill Fletcher notes that scripture and Christians theological writings have presented theological anthropology from a male as norm perspective due to a history of predominantly male theologians and philosophers. She notes that this has had disastrous effects on the lives of women and the valuation of the female perspective and consequently the history of Christian theology has missed opportunities for opening new understandings of what it means to be human.

In the law

Lucinda Finley
Lucinda Finley is the Frank G. Raichle Professor of Trial and Appellate Advocacy at the University of Buffalo and has a research focus on Tort Law and Gender Issues as well as Feminist Legal Theory. Finley argues that although the law is seen to be objective and neutral, laws have been created by men and legal language has been defined by men, therefore, laws which purport to be neutral are reflective of the male gaze. Finley suggests that this further perpetuates the idea of male as norm and women as outsiders of this norm.

Rosemary Hunter
Rosemary Hunter is a Professor of Law and Socio-Legal Studies at the University of Kent and is currently researching feminist judging. Hunter argues that legal practice is culturally still a place where being male is the norm. She suggests women are associated with irrationality, whilst men and law are associated with disembodied reason.  She also suggests that women are considered "outsiders" because female lawyers are forcibly sexualized.

See also

 Markedness

References

Feminism
Feminist terminology
Feminist theory